Amir Jangoo (born 14 July 1997) is a Trinidadian cricketer. He made his List A debut for the West Indies Under-19s in the 2014–15 Regional Super50 on 16 January 2015. He made his first-class debut for Trinidad and Tobago in the 2016–17 Regional Four Day Competition on 7 April 2017. In July 2020, he was named in the Trinbago Knight Riders squad for the 2020 Caribbean Premier League (CPL). He made his Twenty20 debut on 2 September 2020, for the Trinbago Knight Riders in the 2020 CPL.

References

External links
 

1997 births
Living people
Combined Campuses and Colleges cricketers
Trinidad and Tobago cricketers
Trinbago Knight Riders cricketers
West Indies under-19 cricketers